Mortal Kombat: Original Motion Picture Soundtrack is the compilation album that accompanied the 1995 film Mortal Kombat. Three songs by Stabbing Westward were included in the movie, but were omitted from the soundtrack: "Lost", "Lies" and "Can't Happen Here", all of which appear on the album Ungod. Metal vocalist Burton C. Bell is the only artist on the album to appear twice; once with his primary band Fear Factory, and again with side-project GZR. The album features primarily electronic dance music (EDM) along with rock music.

Reception
Mortal Kombat was nominated for the Motion Picture Sound Editors, USA Golden Reel Award. It won the BMI Film & TV Awards BMI Film Music Award. The soundtrack went Platinum in less than a year reaching No. 10 on the Billboard 200, and was included in the 2011 Guinness World Records Gamer's Edition as the "most successful video game spin-off soundtrack album". It was the first electronic dance music (EDM) record to receive a Platinum certification in the United States. Its popularity inspired the album Mortal Kombat: More Kombat.

Track listing

Charts

Weekly charts

Year-end charts

Certifications

References

1995 soundtrack albums
Mortal Kombat music
TVT Records soundtracks
Fantasy film soundtracks
Action film soundtracks